The Wonderful Maladys is a HBO television pilot written by Charles Randolph, directed by Alan Taylor, and starring Sarah Michelle Gellar. HBO did not pick up the series.

Plot 
The show was to have followed three adult siblings in New York City after their parents' deaths. Alice (Sarah Michelle Gellar) found refuge in alcohol and aggressiveness. Mary (Molly Parker) found refuge in her work as a therapist, despite being unable to follow advice she gives to her clients. The last one, Neil (Nate Corddry), found refuge in "weirdness".

Production 
The pilot starred Sarah Michelle Gellar, who also served as an executive producer.

On May 11, 2009, the pilot began shooting at midday in New York City. Outside shots were filmed and recorded at 113th and Riverside Drive two days later, on May 13, 2009.

The pilot also starred Nate Corddry as Gellar's younger "bookish grad student" brother, Molly Parker as her older therapist sister, Adam Scott as Alice's ex, and Zak Orth as her sister's husband.

The pilot was not picked up by HBO.

Cast 
Sarah Michelle Gellar as  Alice Malady
Adam Scott as Alice's ex-boyfriend
Molly Parker as Mary Malady
Nate Corddry as Neil Malady
Zak Orth as Mary's playwright husband
Justine Cotsonas as Bali
Tom Lipinski as Seth
Molly Ephraim as Emo Girl
Adam Driver as Zed
Derek Milman as Jeffery
Stephanie Ellis as Silka Copans
Pia Shah as Ruchi
Shoshanna Withers as Flight Attendant
Monica Kapoor as Pregnant Hostess

References

External links 
 

HBO original programming
Television pilots not picked up as a series
Films directed by Alan Taylor